The Sudan People's Defense Forces/Democratic Front (SPDF) was an anti-government militia active in Upper Nile from 2000 to 2002.

Riek Machar formed the SPDF mostly from deserters of the pro-Khartoum South Sudan Defence Forces (SSDF) and later merged it with the SPLM/A.

Notes

Citations

References

Factions of the Second Sudanese Civil War
Rebel groups in South Sudan
Rebel groups in Sudan